Meiomeniidae is a family of molluscs belonging to the order Pholidoskepia.

Genera:
 Meioherpia Salvini-Plawen, 1985
 Meiomenia Morse, 1979

References

Molluscs